James Kenneth Lefebvre (born January 7, 1942) is a former major league baseball player, coach, and manager. An infielder, he was signed by the Los Angeles Dodgers as an amateur free agent in 1962.

Baseball career

Playing career
Lefebvre was the 1965 National League Rookie of the Year; he hit .250 with 12 home runs and 69 RBI and the Dodgers won the World Series. He started at second base in the All-Star Game in 1966. In 1965, he was part of an infield for the Dodgers that consisted of four players who were switch hitters.  The others were Jim Gilliam, Wes Parker, and Maury Wills.

Lefebvre also played four seasons in Japan, from 1973 until 1976, for the Lotte Orions. Lefebvre became only the second player, after Johnny Logan, to have won a World Series (1965 Dodgers) and a Japan Series with the 1974 Lotte Orions.

He was a big-league manager from 1989–1993, and briefly again in 1999, and was formerly the hitting coach with the Cincinnati Reds.

Managerial and coaching career
Lefebvre was first hired as a major league manager by the Seattle Mariners in November 1988, with a two-year contract at $150,000 annually, with incentives and a team option for a third year. In his second season in 1990, Seattle won 77 games and drew over 1.5 million in home attendance at the Kingdome. Lefebvre finished with a record of 233 wins and 253 losses. With the Milwaukee Brewers, he was the interim manager for the final seven weeks of the 

In addition to managing, Lefebvre has spent time coaching in the Dodgers, Milwaukee Brewers, San Francisco Giants, Oakland Athletics, Cincinnati Reds, and San Diego Padres organizations.  He coached the China National Baseball Team (Olympics) in 2005, the 2006 World Baseball Classic, and 2008 Olympics.

Managerial record

Outside of baseball
Lefebvre had roles on several television shows including Gilligan's Island and Batman. His role in Batman was of a henchman for the Riddler. He is also a spokesman for Vemma vitamin supplements.

Personal life
Jimmy first married Jean Bakke from Waterford, WI and they had their son, Ryan, before they divorced and Jimmy was playing baseball in Japan after he was with the Dodgers, where he was rookie of the year in 1965.
Lefebvre has a daughter, Brittany Lefebvre, who is currently working in Christian motion pictures. His son, Ryan, is the lead play-by-play announcer for the Royals on Bally Sports Kansas City. He also has two other chrildren, Bryce and Brianna Lefebvre.

References

External links

Jim Lefebvre at Baseball Almanac
ArmchairGM
Baseballsavvy.com article

1942 births
Living people
American expatriate baseball players in Japan
Arizona Instructional League Dodgers players
Cincinnati Reds coaches
Los Angeles Dodgers coaches
Los Angeles Dodgers players
Chicago Cubs managers
Lotte Orions players
Major League Baseball first base coaches
Major League Baseball hitting coaches
Baseball players from Inglewood, California
Major League Baseball Rookie of the Year Award winners
Major League Baseball second basemen
Major League Baseball third basemen
Milwaukee Brewers coaches
Milwaukee Brewers managers
Minor league baseball managers
National League All-Stars
Oakland Athletics coaches
Sportspeople from Los Angeles County, California
Seattle Mariners managers
San Francisco Giants coaches
San Francisco Giants executives
Reno Silver Sox players
Salem Dodgers players
Spokane Indians players
Morningside High School alumni